Ayyappan is the god of growth in Hinduism.

Ayyappa may also refer to:

Ayyappa Paniker, an Indian writer
Ayyappa Masagi, an Indian activist
Ayyappa Nagar, a residential area in Chennai
Ayyappa Nayakan Pettai, a village in Tamil Nadu
Swami Ayyappan (1975 film), a Malayalam film